Theophilus Albert Willy was a Republican member of the Wisconsin Legislature.

He was born on April 16, 1845 at Somersetshire, England, where he was educated. In 1866 he came to Appleton, Wisconsin, where he worked as a miller and buyer of grain for a few years. From 1870 to 1878 he was a manufacturer of staves (wooden parts for barrels) and lumber, and was also a dealer of merchandise. In 1878 he returned to his former occupation in the grain industry.

Willy was a member of the State Assembly from 1899 to 1901, and then served in the State Senate from 1901 to 1905.

He died in 1916, and is buried in Forest Hill Cemetery in Madison, Wisconsin.

References

Republican Party Wisconsin state senators
Republican Party members of the Wisconsin State Assembly
1845 births
1916 deaths
19th-century American politicians
Burials in Wisconsin